The 2021 Men's European Volleyball Championship was the 32nd edition of the Men's European Volleyball Championship, organised by Europe's governing volleyball body, CEV. For the second time, the EuroVolley was held in four countries: Poland, Czech Republic, Estonia and Finland. The number of national teams that participated in the event remained to 24.

In Poland, matches were played in Gdańsk, Katowice and Kraków.
In Finland, matches were played in Tampere.
In Czech Republic, matches were played in Ostrava.
In Estonia, matches were played in Tallinn. The top two teams of the tournament qualified for the 2022 FIVB Volleyball Men's World Championship as the CEV representatives.

Italy won their 7th title of Men's European Volleyball Championship. Simone Giannelli was chosen as MVP of this tournament.

Qualification

Pools composition
The drawing of lots is combined with a seeding of National Federations and performed as follows:
 The 4 Organisers are seeded in Preliminary pools. Poland in Pool A, Czech Republic in Pool B, Finland in Pool C and Estonia in Pool D.
 The first and second best ranked from the previous edition of the CEV competition are drawn in different Preliminary pools,
 The organizers can select one team to join their pools.
 According to the CEV National Team ranking list (as per 01/01/2020), 16 remaining teams are seeded by descending order in a number of cups that equals the number of Preliminary pools.

Draw
The drawing of lots was held on 27 May 2021 in Helsinki, Finland.

Squads

Venues

Pool standing procedure
 Number of matches won
 Match points
 Sets ratio
 Points ratio
 If the tie continues as per the point ratio between two teams, the priority will be given to the team which won the match between them. When the tie in points ratio is between three or more teams, a new classification of these teams in the terms of points 1, 2, 3 and 4 will be made taking into consideration only the matches in which they were opposed to each other.

Match won 3–0 or 3–1: 3 match points for the winner, 0 match points for the loser
Match won 3–2: 2 match points for the winner, 1 match point for the loser

Preliminary round
The top four teams in each pool qualified for the final round.

Pool A
All times are Central European Summer Time (UTC+02:00).

|}

|}

Pool B
All times are Central European Summer Time (UTC+02:00).

|}

|}

Pool C
All times are Eastern European Summer Time (UTC+03:00).

|}

|}

Pool D
 All times are Eastern European Summer Time (UTC+03:00).

|}

|}

Final round
All times are Central European Summer Time (UTC+02:00).

Round of 16
|}

Quarterfinals
|}

Semifinals
|}

3rd place match
|}

Final
|}

Final standing

All Star Team
This list was based on 375,394 fan votes.

Most Valuable Player
 Simone Giannelli
Best Setter
 Gregor RopretBest Outside Hitters Alessandro Michieletto 
 Daniele LaviaBest Middle Blockers Marko Podraščanin
 Piotr NowakowskiBest Opposite Nimir Abdel-AzizBest Libero'''
 Fabio Balaso

See also
2021 Women's European Volleyball Championship

References

External links
Official website
CEV website

2021
European Volleyball
European Volleyball
European Volleyball
European Volleyball
European Volleyball
European Volleyball Championship
European Volleyball Championship
European Volleyball Championship
European Volleyball Championship
European Volleyball, 2021, Men
European Volleyball, 2021, Men
European Volleyball, 2021, Men
European Volleyball, 2021, Men
2021 in European sport